The Ohio Valley Greyhounds were a professional indoor football team.  They began play in 1999 as the Steel Valley Smash, a charter member of the IFL.  After the league folded, they moved to the NIFL, became a charter member, and renamed themselves as the Ohio Valley Greyhounds.  After four successful years in the league, they moved to the UIF in 2005 and became a charter member to the new league.  However, the Greyhounds failed to reach the same level of success from the NIFL years.  Their home games were played at the WesBanco Arena in Wheeling, West Virginia, which is also the home to the ECHL's Wheeling Nailers.  After three dismal years in the UIF, the team folded in October 2007.

Season-by-season 

|-
| colspan="6" style="text-align:center;"| Steel Valley Smash (IFL)
|-
|1999 || 2 || 10 || 0 || 4th Southern || --
|-
|2000 || 9 || 5 || 0 || 1st EC Southern || Won Quarterfinal (Green Bay)Lost Semifinal (Peoria)
|-
| colspan="6" style="text-align:center;"| Ohio Valley Greyhounds (NIFL)
|-
|2001 || 11 || 3 || 0 || 1st Atlantic Eastern || Won Round 1 (Lake Charles)Lost Semifinal (Mississippi)
|-
|2002 || 12 || 1 || 0 || 1st Atlantic Northern || Won Round 1 (L. Rangers)Win Semifinal (T. ThunderCats)Won Indoor Bowl II (Billings)
|-
|2003 || 14 || 0 || 0 || 1st Atlantic Eastern || Won Round 1 (Lexington)Won Semifinal (Lake Charles)Won Indoor Bowl III (Utah)
|-
|2004 || 11 || 3 || 0 || 1st Atlantic East || Won AC Semifinal (Fort Wayne)Lost AC Championship (Lexington)
|-
| colspan="6" style="text-align:center;"| Ohio Valley Greyhounds (UIF)
|-
|2005 || 6 || 9 || 0 || 2nd Midwest || Lost Round 1 (Sioux City)
|-
|2006 || 6 || 9 || 0 || 3rd East || --
|-
|2007 || 2 || 13 || 0 || 6th East || --
|-
!Totals || 73 || 53 || 0
|colspan="2"| (including playoffs)

References

External links
 Official website
 UIFans - United Indoor Fans
 Greyhounds' 2001 stats
 Greyhounds' 2002 stats
 Greyhounds' 2003 stats
 Greyhounds' 2004 stats
 Greyhounds' 2005 stats
 Greyhounds' 2006 stats
 Greyhounds' 2007 stats

United Indoor Football teams
Indoor Football League (1999–2000) teams
Defunct indoor American football teams
American football teams in West Virginia
Sports in Wheeling, West Virginia
American football teams established in 1999
American football teams disestablished in 2007
1999 establishments in West Virginia
2007 disestablishments in West Virginia